Afronemacheilus is a genus of stone loaches endemic to Ethiopia.

Species
There are currently 2 recognized species in this genus:
 Afronemacheilus abyssinicus Boulenger, 1902
 Afronemacheilus kaffa Prokofiev & Golubtsov, 2013

References

Nemacheilidae
Freshwater fish of Africa
Fish of Ethiopia
Endemic fauna of Ethiopia